Technical University in Zvolen or Technická univerzita vo Zvolene is a public university located in Zvolen, Slovakia. This university is a member of European Forest Institute.

History 
The university was established as a higher degree college in 1952. At that time it was named College of Forestry and Wood Technology In 1991 the college acquired university status and was renamed to Technical University in Zvolen.

Faculties 
The university has the following faculties:
 Faculty of Forestry
 Faculty of Ecology and Environmental Sciences
 Faculty of Wood Sciences and Technology 
 Faculty of Environmental and Manufacturing Technology

References

External links 
 

Universities in Slovakia
Educational institutions established in 1956
1956 establishments in Czechoslovakia